Patrick Duprat is a Mayotte politician. Formerly a sub-prefect of the French commune of Yssingeaux, Duprat was appointed Secretary-General of the Prefecture of Mayotte on 10 May 2010. He then served as acting Prefect between 4 July and 21 July 2011, from the end of Hubert Derache's tenure to the appointment of Thomas Degos.

References

Living people
Prefects of Mayotte
French civil servants
People from Mayotte
Year of birth missing (living people)